The 1953–54 Rheinlandliga was the second season of the highest amateur class of the Rhineland Football Association under the name of 1. Amateurliga Rheinland. It was a predecessor of today's Rheinlandliga.

The 1. Amateurliga was below II. Division Southwest until 1963 and therefore the third-class in the hierarchy. In the seasons 1956–57 to 1962–63 the league was played in two divisions (East and West). The two division champions played to determine the Rhineland champion. With the introduction of the regional league Southwest as second highest class, starting in the 1963–64 season, the Amateur league Rheinland was again combined into one division. Beginning in the 1974–75 season, the league played a role as a sub-team to the newly introduced 2. Bundesliga, where the Rhineland champion played in a relegation against the champion of the Verbandsliga Südwest and the Saarlandliga, for a position in the south divisions of the 2. Bundesliga. Starting from the 1978–79 season, the Oberliga Rheinland-Pfalz/Saar was introduced as the highest amateur class and this class was renamed to the "Verbandsliga Rheinland" and since then only fourth class.

Results
Rhineland champion was VfL Trier. In the relegation rounds to 2nd Division Southwest, Trier took third place and had to remain in the amateur league. Runner up, FC Urbar, took part in the German Football Amateur Championship in 1954 as a Rhineland representative, but failed again in the group stage. SSV Heimbach-Weis, TuS Konz, SpVgg Zewenr and VfL Brohl had to move down into the 2. amateur league after this season. For the following season, 1954–55, Eintracht Höhr, SC Sinzig, Sportfreunde Daaden and  SV Trier-West moved up from the 2. Amateur League.

References

1953 in association football
1954 in association football
Football in Rhineland-Palatinate